The following is a list of Sites of Special Scientific Interest in the Islay and Jura Area of Search.  For other areas, see List of SSSIs by Area of Search.

 Ardmore, Kildalton and Callumkill Woodlands
 Beinn Shiantaidh
 Bridgend Flats
 Craighouse Ravine Jura
 Doire Dhonn
 Eilean Na Muice Duibhe
 Feur Lochain - Moine nam Faoileann
 Garvellachs
 Glac Na Criche
 Gruinart Flats
 Kinuachdrach
 Laggan Peninsula and Bay
 Loch Fada
 Loch Tallant
 North Colonsay
 Oronsay
 Rinns of Islay
 Rubha A Mhail to Uamhannan Donna Coast
 West Coast of Jura
 West Colonsay Seabird Cliffs

 
Islay and Jura